A Day to Die is an 2022 American heist action film written, directed, and produced by Wes Miller. It stars Kevin Dillon, Bruce Willis, Gianni Capaldi, Brooke Butler, Leon, and Frank Grillo. The film was released on March 4, 2022, by Vertical Entertainment.

Premise
Connor Connolly, a disgraced parole officer, becomes indebted to a local drug kingpin, Tyrone Pettis, after having no choice but to kill one of the latter's young enforcers (an "asset"). Upon having his pregnant wife Candice abducted by Pettis as leverage, Connor is forced to pull off a series of dangerous drug heists within twelve hours in order to pay the $2 million dollars he now owes. Connor recruits his old teammates to conduct the heists with him, rescue his kidnapped pregnant wife, and settle a score with the city's corrupt police chief Alston who had double-crossed them years ago in a botched hostage situation that led to the former team's disbandment. Alston is secretly in an uneasy alliance with Pettis, who has financed his rise to power. The team goes through with the heists, and confronts Pettis whilst rescuing Candice, before coming to a mutual understanding and engaging in one final heist in an attempt to disrupt Alston's criminal operations. In the end, Connor, Pettis, and Candice successfully flee the country, while Alston, having been recorded during the ongoing heist gunning down one of his subordinates who was catching onto his illicit activities, is arrested.

Cast

Production
Principal photography for A Day to Die began in Jackson, Mississippi in March 2021, as the first feature to be shot in the city in 2021. Filming concluded after six weeks in April, with the final scenes being shot in Hawkins Field Airport. In May 2021, Vertical Entertainment acquired distribution rights to the film.

Release
The film was released in select theaters and through video-on-demand on March 4, 2022, by Vertical Entertainment.

Box office
A Day to Die grossed $0 in the United States and Canada and $98,616 in Russia and the United Arab Emirates, plus $240,011 with home video sales, against a production budget of $5 million.

References

External links
 
 

2022 films
Films shot in Mississippi
2022 crime action films
American heist films
American crime action films
Vertical Entertainment films
2020s heist films
2020s English-language films
2022 independent films
American independent films
Films directed by Wes Miller
2020s American films